Gnaphosa saurica is a ground spider species found in Russia, Ukraine, Georgia and Central Asia.

See also 
 List of Gnaphosidae species

References

External links 

Gnaphosidae
Spiders of Asia
Spiders of Georgia (country)
Spiders of Russia
Spiders of Europe
Spiders described in 1992